Eulo is an outback town and locality in the Shire of Paroo, Queensland, Australia. It is known for its opal mining.

Geography

The town is located beside and to the east of the Paroo River which flows in a roughly north–south direction.

The Bulloo Developmental Road (part of the Adventure Way) connects Eulo to Cunnamulla to the east and Thargomindah to the west.

History
Prior to white settlement, Eulo was in the area of the Kalali tribe.

Margany (also known as Marganj, Mardigan, Marukanji, Maranganji) is an Australian Aboriginal language spoken by the Margany people. The Margany language region includes the landscape within the local government boundaries of the Quilpie Shire, taking in Quilpie, Cheepie and Beechal extending towards Eulo and Thargomindah, as well as the properties of Dynevor Downs and Ardoch.

The town takes its name from a settlement on the Paroo River first appearing on an 1872 map of Queensland map.

The post office opened on 6 September 1872; the first postmaster was the publican William Shearer.

A town reserve was proclaimed in 1874 described as "near the Eulo waterhole".

A police station was established about 1 January 1880.

A Court of Petty Sessions was established on 18 August 1880 and operated until 31 December 1964.

A telegraph office opened in 1881.

Eulo Provisional School opened on 7 May 1888. On 1 January 1909 it became Eulo State School.

The telephone exchange opened in 1923.

St Francis' Anglican Church was dedicated by Archbishop Reginald Halse on 15 September 1957. Its closure on 12 June 2010 was approved by Archbishop Phillip Aspinall.

Heritage listings 

 1929 Building of Eulo State School

Facilities
Eulo has one pub and a small general store as well as Outback Petrol. The general store and fuel bowsers were destroyed by fire on 25 July 2011. They have since been rebuilt.

Education
Eulo State School is a government primary (Early Childhood-6) school for boys and girls at Leo Street. The enrolments between 2010 and 2012 have ranged from 11 to 16 students. In 2018, the school had an enrolment of 14 students with 2 teachers and 4 non-teaching staff (2 full-time equivalent). Some students travel up to  each day to attend school, while other students live in the Eulo and District Hostel during the week in order to attend. After completing primary school in Eulo, most students attend a secondary boarding school in Brisbane or Toowoomba.

Events

Eulo once hosted the World Lizard Racing Championships on their Paroo Track, but environmentalists put an end to that annual event.

Notable residents

 Isabel Gray (better known as the Eulo Queen) was a publican, storekeeper and prostitute

Gallery

References

External links

 

Towns in Queensland
Mining towns in Queensland
Shire of Paroo
Localities in Queensland